The Launch Emplacement 8 (LE-8) is a former United States Air Force intercontinental ballistic missile launch facility at Vandenberg Space Force Base, California, United States.

References

Bibliography

External links

Vandenberg Space Force Base